Ladislaus Garai, also Ladislas Garai, (1410 – February or April 1459) was Palatine of Hungary from 1447 to 1458, and Ban of Macsó between 1431 and 1441 and from 1445 and 1447.

Childhood
Ladislaus was the son of Nicholas Garai, Palatine of Hungary and his wife, Anna of Celje. His father was a most powerful baron in the Kingdom of Hungary in the reign of King Sigismund. Ladislaus's mothera daughter of Hermann II, Count of Celjewas the sister of King Sigismund's wife, Barbara of Celje. Ladislaus was born around 1410, but he was first mentioned in a royal charter of 1424.

Family

References

Sources

 
 
 
 
 
 
 

1410s births
1459 deaths
Bans of Macsó
Ladislaus
Palatines of Hungary
15th-century Hungarian people